Yeh Hai Aashiqui is an Indian Hindi-language television romance anthology series that premiered on 25 August 2013 on Bindass. It presents dramatisations of the real life love stories created by Vikas Gupta.  The show went off air on 7 August 2016 with 4 seasons and 153 episodes.

The title track of the series is written by Abhiruchi Chand and composed by Abhishek Arora. The fourth season's title track is sung by Mohit Chauhan and Neeti Mohan.

Overview

Plot
Yeh Hai Aashiqui is a romance anthology series of unconventional stories about love and relationships that are considered taboo by the society as they go against the traditional mindset.

Episodes

Season 1 - Love Heroes

Season 2 - Siyappa Ishq Ka

Season 3 - Sun Yaar Try Maar

Season 4

Cast

Season 1 

 Episode 1: Tasveer Anita Hassanandani as Priyanka, Yuvraj Thakur as Tushar,"   Charlie Chauhan as Suhina, Vineet Raina as Manoj,  Kishwer Merchant and Suyyash Rai in Guest Appearance

 Episode 2: Tip Tip Barsa Pyaar
Veebha Anand as Sapna and Gaurav Bajaj as Vinay 

 Episode 3: Deadline
Abigail Jain as Komal and Vishal Singh as Anmol

 Episode 4: Bhai Jaan
Adaa Khan as Shubhalaxmi Iyer and Lavin Gothi as Bhaskar 

 Episode 6: Aankhon Dekhi
Soumya Seth as Sara Hussain
 Episode 7: Lights, Camera, Heartbreak
Rithvik Dhanjani as Kabir and Mihika Verma as Fiza
 Vinay Rohrra as Ankur and Priyal Gor as Mukti (Rpisode 8)
 Shakti Arora as Mayank and Anupriya Kapoor as Suman (Episode 9)
 Jugal Hansraj and Jayashree Venketramanam (Episode 11)
 Sehban Azim as Neel and Pooja Gor as Pakhi (Episode 14)
  Nabeel Ahmed   as Vibhu and Manoj (2 episodes) 
 Mayank Gandhi as Ranveer and Neha Sargam as Shruti (episode 15)
 Barkha Bisht as Urmi and Shravan Reddy as Arjun (episode 26)
 Amrita Prakash as Tabasum and Shahab Khan as Imraan (episode 27)
 Mohit Malhotra as Mac and Dimple Jhangiani as Manasvi (episode 34)
 Kunal Bhatia as Karan Thakkar (episode 45)
 Aditya Redij as Aditya and Nazea Hasan Sayed as Shruti (episode 35)
 Neelam Sivia as Naina (episode 55)
 Chhavi Pandey as Dhristi and Nakul Sahdev as Armaan (episode 74)
 Shrishti Ganguly Rindani as Udita and Rohan Mehra as Amar (episode 77)
 as Ashish and as Keli (episode 79)
 Smriti Khanna as Reeva (episode 88)
 Shantanu Maheshwari as Shaan and Vrushika Mehta as Rukhsaar (episode 93)
 Rithvik Dhanjani as Rithvik and Asha Negi as Asha (episode 94)
 Raj Singh Arora as Aditya
 Karan Jotwani as Ashish
 Priya Bathija as Manini
 Vivek Dahiya as Devesh
 Ali Merchant as Rudra
 Himmanshoo A. Malhotra as Mayur and Shivshakti Sachdev as Bhoomi
 Ayaz Ahmed as Kanishk and Nikita Sharma as Pragya
 Sumeet Sachdev as Aseem Sen
 Ravish Desai as Arjit and Riya Bamniyal as Ahana
 Sana Saeed as Nandini and Ravi Dubey as Rishi
 Suyyash Rai
 Tanya Abrol as Santosh, Meiyang Chang as jigme Amitayushya Mishra as Sachin
 Priya Chauhan as Priya
 Shaleen Bhanot as Rakshit (episode 50)
 Vrinda Dawda as Sneha and Neil Bhatt as Pratyush
 Gaurav S Bajaj as Rishi and Riddhi Dogra as Mili.
 Anurag Sharma as Prateek
 Shivya Pathania
 Soumya Seth as Sara Hussain and Karan Sharma
 Fenil Umrigar as Rachael and Shraman Jain as Ayush
 Niti Taylor as Trisha and Rohan Shah as Rishi
 Rohan Shah as Mohit
 Veebha Anand as Sapna
 Ruslaan Mumtaz as Kabir Khan (episode 70)
 Sumona Chakravarti as Tejaswini
 Aishwarya Sakhuja and Sangram Singh
 Mohit Abrol as Ahaan
 Annie Gill
 Ravjeet Singh
 Mansi Srivastava
 Siddhant Karnick as Karan and Meher Vij
 Kunal Jaisingh as Prince Jeet Singh
 Shilpa Saklani as Aditi and Karanvir Bohra as Rohan
 Mrinalini Tyagi and Kanwar Dhillon
 Additi Gupta as Ganga and Milli
 Ankit Gera
 Manoj Chandila
 Abigail Jain
 Arjun Bijlani as Varun
 Rucha Gujarathi
 Barkha Sengupta
Neha Sargam

Season 2 
 Nakul Sahadev as Reyansh aka Rio & Roshmita Rahaman as Sneha (Episode 2: Super Duper Love).
 Shrishti Rindani as Pankhuri, Ayush Mehra as Aditya & Mahira Sharma as Shweta (Episode 4: Best Friends Forever).
Teeshay Shah as Avi & Sheetal Singh as Ananya (Episode 6: Misunderstanding).
 Annie Gill as Krish & Jitendra Nokewal as Nick (Episode: Weekend Boyfriend )
 Zaan Khan as Shrey & Jayshree Venkatraman as Naina (Episode 17: Never Been Kissed).
 Abigail Jain as Jasmine & Abhishek Kapur as Dilawar aka D.K. (Episode 20: Start-up).

Season 3 
Shehzad Shaikh as Mukul and Sana Sayyad as Avanti (Episode 10: Bhangover).
Darsheel Safary as Abhay and Rhea Sharma as Chandini (Episode 11: Pyaar me 2nd).
Aashika Bhatia

Season 4 
 Shehzad Shaikh as Ankush and Namita Dubey as Pammi (Episode 1: Pammi Ki Shaadi).
 Krishna Mukherjee as Sanjana and Reyaansh Chadha as Kunal (Episode 2: Kidnapped).
 Chandni Bhagwanani as Gulnazz and Nakul Sahadev as Sahil (Episode 3: Pass Ya Fail).
 Karan Jotwani as Abhiram and Kaashish Vohra as Ayesha (Episode 4: Hindu Muslim).
 Urfi Javed as Alia and Aakarshan Singh as Akash (Episode 5: Escort)
 Aashim Gulati as Ayush and Sanaya Pithawalla as Anokhi (Episode 6: Gangster).
 Krissann Barretto as Alisha & Ronit Kapil as Zaheer (Episode 7: Bartender).
 Mansi Srivastava as Ambika and Karan Sharma as Ranjeet (Episode 8: Hostel).
Vaishali Takkar as Vrinda & (Episode 9: Driver's Son).
 Aneri Vajani as Riddhi and Mishkat Varma as Josy (Episode 10: Secret Marriage).
Vikas Manaktala as Neil and Manasi Rachh as Aarohi (Episode 11: Blind Romance).
 Sehban Azim as Nikhil aka Nick and Akasa Singh as Piya (Episode 12: Bikers).
 Charlie Chauhan as Inara and Kunwar Amar as Ayaan (Episode 13: Shall We Dance).
 Shivangi Joshi as Meera and Ravjeet Singh as Angad (Episode 14: Bodyguard).
 Ankit Gera as Atish and Pooja Sharma as Shivi (Episode 15: Trafficking).
 Shaleen Malhotra as Arjun and Nisha Nagpal as Mahi (Episode 16: Khap).
 Shivya Pathania as Zara and Adhish Khanna as Nakul (Episode 17: Saving Zara).
 Mrinal Dutt as Yuraj and Monica Sehgal as Kavya (Episode 18: Vote For Love).
 Zaan Khan as Vicky and Priyamvada Kant as Sheena (Episode 19: Office Romance).
 Rishi Dev as Ranvir and Shanice Shrestha as Sonakshi (Episode 20: Girl In The Photograph).
 Parv Kalia as Jai and Nida Chakraborty as Pallavi (Episode 21: HIV).
 Rhea Sharma as Shubhi and Kinshuk Vaidya as Ambar (Episode 22: Ex-Convict).
 Rahul Verma Rajput as Avi and Ishita Ganguly as Navya (Episode 23: Forget Me Not).
 Fahad Ali as Ashwin & Annie Gill as Maya (Episode 24: Trippin In Love).
Ayush Mehra as Aarav and Shrishti Ganguly Rindani as Ahana (Episode 25: Heartly Yours).
 Vinita Joshi as Dr. Mihika and Manish Tulsiyani as Raghav (Episode 26: Goon With A Good Heart).
 Raqesh Vashisth as Raqesh and Riddhi Dogra as Riddhi.

Guests 
2014 – Madhuri Dixit to promote her film Dedh Ishqiya.
2014 – Parineeti Chopra and Sidharth Malhotra to promote their film Hasee Toh Phasee.
2015 – Shahid Kapoor and Alia Bhatt to promote their film Shaandaar.

References

External links 

 Official Website
 

2013 Indian television series debuts
2016 Indian television series endings
Bindass original programming
Indian anthology television series
Indian drama television series
Indian romance television series
Indian teen drama television series
Serial drama television series